Ibrahima Sacko (born 24 May 1993) is a French professional footballer who plays as a midfielder for Championnat National 2 side Fréjus Saint-Raphaël.

Career
Born in Meulan, Sacko played at U17 and U19 level with Brest. He left Brest in the summer of 2011, signing a contra stagiare-professional (trainee-professional contract) with Valenciennes. He made his senior debut (and only appearance) with Valenciennes on 31 August 2011, appearing as a substitute in a 3–2 defeat to Dijon in the Coupe de la Ligue.

In June 2014 Sacko signed for Championnat de France Amateur (fourth tier) side L'Entente SSG. The following season he was one of 16 new players signed by US Boulogne, moving up a division to play in Championnat National.

Despite interest from Ligue 2 clubs, Sacko remained in the third tier with GS Consolat, signing at the end of June 2017. The Marseille team suffered relegation at the end of the season, and Sacko remained at the same level with Bourg-Péronnas. 

Sacko was one of a large group of players leaving Bourg-Péronnas at the end of the shortened 2019–20 season, signing for Étoile Fréjus Saint-Raphaël in Championnat National 2.

Career statistics

References

External links
 
 

1993 births
Living people
People from Meulan-en-Yvelines
Footballers from Yvelines
French footballers
Association football midfielders
Valenciennes FC players
Entente SSG players
US Boulogne players
Athlético Marseille players
Football Bourg-en-Bresse Péronnas 01 players
ÉFC Fréjus Saint-Raphaël players
Championnat National players
Championnat National 2 players
Championnat National 3 players